Neil Conway (1670–1738) was an Irish prelate of the Roman Catholic Church.

Conway was born in Ballinascreen, County Londonderry and ordained a priest in 1697. He served as Bishop of Derry from his consecration in 1727 until his death on 6 January 1738. He received the degree of Doctor of Divinity (DD). He was buried at Moneyconey.

References

Bibliography

1670 births
1738 deaths
18th-century Roman Catholic bishops in Ireland
Roman Catholic bishops of Derry
Year of birth unknown